Antiochia in Sittacene was an ancient city founded in the Hellenistic period, possibly by Antiochus I.  Pliny in his Natural History, Book 6, § 206, describes it as an important town in the western part of the ancient region of Sittacene, between the Tigris and Tornadotus rivers.  Its present site is in Iraq.

References
Pliny's Natural History

Seleucid colonies
Former populated places in Iraq